Juan Moisés Luna Custodio (born 8 May 1977) is a Peruvian footballer who plays primarily as a forward. He currently plays for Sport Áncash.

Club career
He started his career with playing in the youth divisions of Universitario de Deportes. Then he began his senior career with América Cochahuayco in the Segunda División Peruana.

He joined Second Division side Lawn Tennis F.C. for the 1997 season and helped them win promotion for the following season by finishing first.  Playing for Lawn Tennis FC, Luna made his debut in the Torneo Descentralizado in the 1998 season.

Luna had a short spell with Alianza Lima for the start of the 2000 Descentralizado season. Later that same season he played for Juan Aurich.

Honours

Club
José Gálvez
Torneo Intermedio: 2011
Segunda División: 2011

References

External links

1977 births
People from Ica Region
Living people
Peruvian footballers
U América F.C. footballers
Club Alianza Lima footballers
Juan Aurich footballers
Olímpico Somos Perú footballers
Colegio Nacional Iquitos footballers
José Gálvez FBC footballers
Sport Áncash footballers
Peruvian Primera División players
Peruvian Segunda División players
Copa Perú players
Association football forwards